A state of the United States is one of the 50 constituent entities that shares its sovereignty with the federal government. Americans are citizens of both the federal republic and of the state in which they reside, due to the shared sovereignty between each state and the federal government. Kentucky, Massachusetts, Pennsylvania, and Virginia use the term commonwealth rather than state in their full official names.

States are the primary subdivisions of the United States. They possess all powers not granted to the federal government, nor prohibited to them by the Constitution of the United States. In general, state governments have the power to regulate issues of local concern, such as regulating intrastate commerce, running elections, creating local governments, public school policy, and non-federal road construction and maintenance. Each state has its own constitution grounded in republican principles, and government consisting of executive, legislative, and judicial branches. 

All states and their residents are represented in the federal Congress, a bicameral legislature consisting of the Senate and the House of Representatives. Each state is represented by two senators, and at least one representative, while the size of a state's House delegation depends on its total population, as determined by the most recent constitutionally mandated decennial census. Additionally, each state is entitled to select a number of electors to vote in the Electoral College, the body that elects the President of the United States and Vice President of the United States, equal to the total of representatives and senators in Congress from that state. 

Article IV, Section 3, Clause 1 of the Constitution grants to Congress the authority to admit new states into the Union. Since the establishment of the United States in 1776, the number of states has expanded from the original 13 to 50. Each new state has been admitted on an equal footing with the existing states.

The following table is a list of all 50 states and their respective dates of statehood. The first 13 became states in July 1776 upon agreeing to the United States Declaration of Independence, and each joined the first Union of states between 1777 and 1781, upon ratifying the Articles of Confederation, its first constitution. (A separate table is included below showing AoC ratification dates.) These states are presented in the order in which each ratified the 1787 Constitution and joined the others in the new (and current) federal government. The date of admission listed for each subsequent state is the official date set by Act of Congress.

List of U.S. states

Articles of Confederation ratification dates
The Second Continental Congress approved the Articles of Confederation for ratification by the individual states on November 15, 1777. The Articles of Confederation came into force on March 1, 1781, after being ratified by all 13 states. On March 4, 1789, the general government under the Articles was replaced with the federal government under the present Constitution.

See also
 Territorial evolution of the United States
 Enabling Act of 1802, authorizing residents of the eastern portion of the Northwest Territory to form the state of Ohio
 Missouri Compromise, 1820 federal statute enabling the admission of Missouri (a slave state) and Maine (a free state) into the Union
 Toledo War, 1835–36 boundary dispute between Ohio and the adjoining Michigan Territory, which delayed Michigan's admission to the Union
 Texas annexation, the 1845 incorporation of the Republic of Texas into the United States as a state in the Union
 Legal status of Texas
 Compromise of 1850, a package of congressional acts, one of which provided for the admission of California to the Union
 Bleeding Kansas, a series of violent conflicts in Kansas Territory involving anti-slavery and pro-slavery factions in the years preceding Kansas statehood, 1854–61
 Enabling Act of 1889, authorizing residents of Dakota, Montana, and Washington territories to form state governments (Dakota to be divided into two states) and to gain admission to the Union
 Oklahoma Enabling Act, authorizing residents of the Oklahoma and Indian territories to form a state government and to be admitted to the union as a single state, and, authorizing the people of New Mexico and Arizona territories to form a state government and be admitted into the Union, requiring a referendum to determine if both territories should be admitted as a single state
 Alaska Statehood Act, admitting Alaska as a state in the Union as of January 3, 1959
 Legal status of Alaska
 Hawaii Admission Act, admitting Hawaii as a state in the Union as of August 21, 1959
 Legal status of Hawaii
 List of states and territories of the United States
 Federalism in the United States
 Proposals for a 51st state

Notes

References

External links

 
 

Date Of Admission To The Union
United States geography-related lists
United States history-related lists
United States history timelines